The 3rd West Asian Games were to be held from 7 to 17 April 2003 in Damascus, Syria. However, they were postponed and then cancelled. On 4 April 2002 the West Asian Games Federation decided that the Games would be held every four years, instead of two, namely one year before the Asian Games.

The Third West Asian Games was held from the 1 to 10 December 2005 in Doha, Qatar as test event for the 2006 Asian Games and involved over 1,200 athletes from 13 nations participating in 11 sports. Women participated in the West Asian Games for the first time.

Venues

 Qatar SC - Opening and closing ceremonies, Football, Basketball
 Hamad Aquatic Centre - Aquatics (Swimming and Diving)
 Khalifa International Stadium - Athletics
 Qatar Bowling Centre - Bowling
 Al-Arabi Sports Club - Gymnastics and Fencing
 Al-Gharrafa Sports Club - Football, Handball
 Al-Rayyan Sports Club - Football, Volleyball
 Al-Duhail Shooting Range - Shooting
 Al-Sadd Sports Club - Weightlifting

Sports

Aquatics

Participating nations

Medal table

Changes in medal standings
Four players who took part in the third West Asian Games have tested positive for taking steroids.

See also
 2006 Asian Games
 2011 Pan Arab Games

References

External links
 Olympic Council of Asia - 2005 West Asian Games
 Medal table

 
West Asian Games
West Asian Games, 2005
International sports competitions hosted by Qatar
Multi-sport events in Qatar
21st century in Doha